Shemia Patricia Fagan (born September 20, 1981) is an American lawyer and politician serving as the Oregon secretary of state. She previously served as a Democratic member of the Oregon Senate, representing Senate District 24 from in 2019 to 2021. She also represented House District 51 from 2013 to 2017. In 2020, Fagan secured the Democratic nomination for Oregon Secretary of State in a close three-way race, and went on to defeat Republican Kim Thatcher in the general election.

Early life and education 
Fagan was born in Portland, Oregon, and was raised in Dufur, Oregon, and The Dalles, Oregon by her father, with her two older brothers. She attended Northwest Nazarene University in Nampa, Idaho, on a soccer scholarship, where she earned her Bachelor of Arts in Philosophy and Religion in 2003. She then started law school at Willamette University College of Law in Salem, Oregon, before earning her Juris Doctor from Lewis & Clark Law School in 2009.

Career 
After graduating from law school, Fagan became an associate at the Ater Wynne law firm in Portland, Oregon. She was an employment law attorney with HKM Employment Attorneys.

In 2011, Fagan was elected to the David Douglas School Board in eastern Portland, serving for three years before running for 51st District of the Oregon House of Representatives. During her time within the State House, she served as the chair of the House Committee on Consumer Protection and Government Effectiveness. Fagan was elected to the 24th District of the Oregon State Senate during the 2018 elections; she chaired the Committee on Housing and Development and served on the Committee On Healthcare. In 2020, Fagan was elected as Oregon Secretary of State.

Political positions

Economy and labor
During the COVID-19 pandemic in the United States, including Oregon, Fagan voted to authorize unemployment benefits for employees working less than full time. Fagan also supported a bill in 2019 that would establish 12 weeks of paid medical leave for workers. During the same year, Fagan supported HB 2016, which provided additional privileges to labor unions in bolstering worker participation.

Environment
During her time within the Oregon House, Fagan was supportive of several key environmental bills, receiving a 100% rating from the Oregon League of Conservation Voters (OLCV). She supported SB 1547 Coal Transition and Clean Electricity Plan which set goals for Oregon to go coal-free by 2030. In 2020, the Oregon League of Conservation Voters endorsed Fagan during the Secretary of State race.

Health care
In 2019, Fagan supported HB 3076, which established standards for non-profit hospitals in Oregon, demanding non-profit hospitals to adjust patients' costs on the basis of federal poverty guidelines and prohibiting non-profit hospitals from charging interest on medical debt.

Elections
2012: Challenging incumbent Republican Representative Patrick Sheehan for the District 51 seat, Fagan was unopposed for the May 15, 2012 Democratic primary, winning with 2,765 votes, and won the November 6, 2012 general election with 12,584 votes (52.8%) against Representative Sheehan.
2014: Fagan won re-election to the House, defeating Republican Jodi Bailey with 52% of the vote. In 2016, she declined to run for re-election, citing "business and family reasons."
2018: Fagan won the Democratic primary for state Senate after challenging incumbent Rod Monroe in a race dominated by housing issues. Fagan won the three-way race with 62 percent of the vote, and went on to an unopposed victory in the November general election. After winning election as Oregon Secretary of State, Fagan resigned her Senate seat.  She was succeeded by Kayse Jama.
2020: Fagan won the Democratic primary for Secretary of State in a tough three-way race. She went on to win the general election, defeating Republican state senator Kim Thatcher.

Electoral history

2012

2014

2018

2020

References

External links
Official biography, Oregon Secretary of State
Campaign site
 

1981 births
21st-century American politicians
21st-century American women politicians
American labor lawyers
Lewis & Clark Law School alumni
Living people
Democratic Party members of the Oregon House of Representatives
Oregon lawyers
Northwest Nazarene University alumni
People from Lincoln County, Oregon
People from Wasco County, Oregon
Secretaries of State of Oregon
Women state legislators in Oregon